Jamie Wright (born May 13, 1976) is a Canadian former professional ice hockey left winger who played in the National Hockey League (NHL) with the Dallas Stars, Calgary Flames and Philadelphia Flyers. Wright was born in Kitchener, Ontario, but grew up in Elmira, Ontario.

Playing career
Wright was selected 98th overall by the Dallas Stars in the 1994 NHL Entry Draft. Wright has played 124 career NHL games, scoring 12 goals and 20 assists for 32 points. He also played for team Canada in the 1996 World Junior Championships in Boston, scoring one goal and two assists in the tournament.

Career statistics

References

External links
 

1976 births
Calgary Flames players
Canadian ice hockey left wingers
Dallas Stars draft picks
Dallas Stars players
DEG Metro Stars players
Edmonton Road Runners players
EHC Basel players
Frankfurt Lions players
Genève-Servette HC players
Guelph Storm players
HC Sierre players
Ice hockey people from Ontario
Kalamazoo Wings (1974–2000) players
Living people
Lukko players
People from Woolwich, Ontario
Philadelphia Flyers players
Philadelphia Phantoms players
Saint John Flames players
Sportspeople from Kitchener, Ontario
Toronto Roadrunners players
Utah Grizzlies (IHL) players
Canadian expatriate ice hockey players in Finland
Canadian expatriate ice hockey players in Germany
Canadian expatriate ice hockey players in Switzerland
Canadian expatriate ice hockey players in the United States